Jørgen Aukland (born 6 August 1975) is a Norwegian long-distance cross-country skier. He is the brother of Anders Aukland and Fredrik Aukland.

Aukland went to college at the Norwegian School of Sport Sciences.

In 2008, he won Vasaloppet.

On 9 April 2016, it was announced that he was going to retire following Nordenskiöldsloppet in Sweden the next day.

Cross-country skiing results
All results are sourced from the International Ski Federation (FIS).

World Cup

Season standings

Individual podiums

 1 podium (1 )

Sports merits
 2002 Vasaloppet - 2nd
 2003 Vasaloppet - 2nd
 2003 FIS Marathon Cup - Winner
 2003 Marcialonga - Winner
 2004 Vasaloppet - 3rd
 2005 Vasaloppet - 3rd
 2006 Marcialonga - Winner
 2007 Vasaloppet - 3rd
 2008 Vasaloppet - Winner
 2012 Marcialonga - Winner
 2013 Marcialonga - Winner
 2013 Vasaloppet - Winner

References

External links

1975 births
Living people
Norwegian male cross-country skiers
Joergen
Vasaloppet winners
Norwegian School of Sport Sciences alumni
Sportspeople from Tønsberg